Gegard Mousasi (born 1 August 1985), is a Dutch mixed martial artist and former kickboxer, currently competing in Bellator MMA, where he is the former two-time Bellator Middleweight Champion. As of December 13, 2022, he is #10 in the Bellator men's pound-for-pound rankings and #1 in the Bellator Middleweight Rankings. He is also the former DREAM Light Heavyweight Champion, former DREAM Middleweight Champion, former  Cage Warriors World Middleweight Champion, and the former Strikeforce Light Heavyweight Champion, thus making Mousasi an overall six-time MMA world champion. At the moment of his departure from the UFC in July 2017, he was #4 in the official UFC middleweight rankings, and he is currently ranked the #9 middleweight MMA fighter in the world by Fight Matrix.

Background
Mousasi was born in Tehran, Iran to ethnic-Armenian parents during the Iran–Iraq War. His family name was changed in Iran long before his birth from Mofsesian to Mousasi. After spending a year in refugee camps, at the age of four, Mousasi and his family relocated to Leiden, Netherlands where he finished grade school before developing an interest in martial arts. Mousasi began training in judo at the age of eight and later boxing at age 15; a year later he became the amateur boxing champion of the Netherlands with a 12–1 record, earning nine knockouts. Mousasi then transitioned into kickboxing and then eventually to mixed martial arts.

Mixed martial arts career

Pride FC Welterweight Grand Prix
In 2006 Mousasi signed with Pride FC to take part in Pride's Welterweight Grand Prix. In the opening round Mousasi faced Makoto Takimoto, at Pride Bushido 11, beating the Japanese fighter by TKO as the result of a broken eye socket in the first round. In the quarterfinals Mousasi went on to face Akihiro Gono, but was submitted in the second round by an armbar. After losing to Gono, Mousasi fought Héctor Lombard in the Grand Prix Alternate bout and took a unanimous decision victory over the Cuban-born fighter.

Dream Middleweight Grand Prix
In the first round of the Dream's 2008 Middleweight Grand Prix at Dream 2, Gegard defeated Brazilian jiu-jitsu black belt Denis Kang by triangle choke. Kang had defeated Gono in the semifinals of the Pride Welterweight Grand Prix. In the second round of the tournament, at Dream 4, Mousasi won a decision victory over Yoon Dong-sik and advanced to the final round, which took place at Dream 6. There he fought and submitted K-1 veteran Melvin Manhoef in the semifinals before meeting up with submission specialist Ronaldo Souza in the final. Mousasi defeated Souza by an upkick after being taken down by the Brazilian, thus becoming the first Dream Middleweight Champion and 2008 Middleweight Grand Prix tournament winner. Souza went on to win the Dream Middleweight Championship and later the Strikeforce Middleweight Championship.

ADCC Championships
On November 21, 2008, ADCC Europe president Marko Leistén confirmed the signing of Mousasi as one of ADCC's 2009 competitors. It was rumored he would fight in the -88 kg category. For unknown reasons, Mousasi never participated in the ADCC 2009 Championships.

M-1 Global
Gegard Mousasi next made an appearance at M-1 Global's Breakthrough event at August 28, 2009, where he sparred with former Pride Heavyweight and current WAMMA Heavyweight Champion Fedor Emelianenko, a friend and teammate, in an exhibition match. The two friends fought a competitive and friendly spirited exhibition with several Judo throws from both Emelianenko and Mousasi. Mousasi was defeated with a straight armbar.

In February 2010, Mousasi left M-1 Global Management. Mousasi was quoted as saying "After careful consideration, I have decided that it is in my best interest to part ways with M-1 Global," Mousasi wrote in the e-mail. "During the time I spent under their wing, M-1 Global, as a promoter and management company, allowed me to achieve many great things. I appreciate all they have done for me. My management is being taken care of by someone close to me."

Dream Super Hulk Grand Prix
In interviews from early 2009, Mousasi stated the weight he put on after winning Dream's middleweight tournament was too much for him to cut back down to middleweight and that his next fights would be at light heavyweight and eventually heavyweight instead.

Then he signed for a place at Dream's openweight Grand Prix, the Super Hulk Grand Prix, being scheduled to face Mark Hunt in the opening round.
Mousasi submitted Hunt in the first round of the Super Hulk Grand Prix at Dream 9.
Mousasi was then expected to face Rameau Thierry Sokoudjou at Dream 11, but he had to step down due to injury.

Affliction
Mousasi was set to fight Renato Sobral at Affliction: Trilogy on August 1, 2009, but the event was canceled after losing its main event 10 days prior to the event. It was originally planned for him to face Vitor Belfort at that event, but there was a disagreement between both fighters over which weight class the fight would be fought at.

Strikeforce and Dream
On Monday July 27, 2009 it was announced that the cancelled bout between Sobral and Mousasi would take place on the August 15 Strikeforce: Carano vs. Cyborg card and the fight became a contest for the Strikeforce Light Heavyweight Championship. Mousasi defeated Sobral via KO in the first minute of the first round to become the Strikeforce Light Heavyweight Champion.

Mousasi would go on to win his second Strikeforce bout by TKO (punches), three minutes and forty-three seconds into the 2nd round against Rameau Thierry Sokoudjou, who Mousasi was previously supposed to fight at Dream 11, on November 7, 2009 at Strikeforce: Fedor vs. Rogers. Mousasi was originally slated to defend his Strikeforce Light Heavyweight Championship, but eventually competed in a non-title bout.

Mousasi quickly defeated journeyman Gary Goodridge under MMA rules at Dynamite!! 2009.

On April 17, 2010, Mousasi lost the Strikeforce Light Heavyweight Championship belt in his first defense to Muhammed Lawal by way of unanimous decision. Lawal landed 11 of 14 takedowns, however Mousasi had outlanded Lawal in Total Punches 171 to 125. Mousasi was also given a point deduction following an illegal up-kick. Lawal would later test positive for anabolic steroids following a fight with Lorenz Larkin.

Dream Light Heavyweight Grand Prix
The 1st round took place at Dream 15, where Mousasi faced Jake O'Brien, who came in overweight to their bout. Dream officials made it a catchweight fight, but allowed the fight to be part of the tournament. Mousasi won the fight early in the first round by submission via standing guillotine choke.
In the final, Mousasi faced Tatsuya Mizuno. Mousasi dominated the whole fight and finished the Japanese fighter in the first round via rear-naked choke.

Last of Strikeforce
Mousasi was expected to face Mike Kyle on April 9, 2011 at Strikeforce 33. However, Kyle was forced off the card with an injury and was replaced by Keith Jardine. The fight resulted in a majority draw due to an illegal upkick in the first round which resulted in a point deduction for Mousasi. Otherwise the bout would've been a unanimous decision victory for Mousasi. According to Fightmetric statistics, Mousasi outstruck Jardine 146 to 21. After the fight in an interview with Ariel Helwani of MMA Fighting.com, Strikeforce CEO Scott Coker stated “I’ve got a lot of respect for Keith Jardine, but I think Gegard won the fight.” In the same interview, Coker also stated that a rematch between Mousasi and Jardine was definitely a possibility for the future. MMA Fighting.com named this fight their Runner-Up for "Robbery of the Half-Year."

Mousasi returned to Strikeforce to face Ovince Saint Preux on December 17, 2011 at Strikeforce: Melendez vs. Masvidal. He won the fight via unanimous decision, showing improved takedown defense and wrestling.

Mousasi was expected to face Mike Kyle at Strikeforce: Tate vs. Rousey, but Kyle once again withdrew due to injury.

Mousasi was later recovering from knee surgery following a torn ACL and was expected to fully recover by November, 2012. He also signed a new contract for six more fights with the organization, making a total of seven. However, with Strikeforce having shut down, this contract was likely now null and void.

Mousasi faced Mike Kyle at Strikeforce: Marquardt vs. Saffiedine on January 12, 2013. After avoiding most of Kyle's strikes in the early going, Mousasi took the fight to the ground and went on to finish the fight via rear-naked choke submission late in the first round. This was the fourth time a fight between Mousasi and Kyle was scheduled and the first time it wasn't canceled.

Ultimate Fighting Championship
On January 15, 2013, the UFC announced Mousasi would be joining 19 other Strikeforce fighters in a move to the UFC after his win over Mike Kyle at the promotion's last event, Strikeforce: Marquardt vs. Saffiedine.

Mousasi was expected to make his promotional debut against Alexander Gustafsson on April 6, 2013 at UFC on Fuel TV 9. However, on March 30, Gustafsson suffered a cut in training and, on April 2, was deemed unclear to participate by the Swedish MMA Federation. Gustafsson was replaced by Ilir Latifi, a UFC newcomer and training partner of Gustafsson. Mousasi won by unanimous decision, avoiding his opponent's takedown attempts and dominating the fight on the feet. He fought with an injured knee and underwent surgery after the fight. UFC President Dana White praised Mousasi for going through with the fight injured and in his opponents home, as well as accepting a late change of opponents.

Drop to middleweight
For his second fight with the promotion, Mousasi moved down to middleweight to face former light heavyweight champion Lyoto Machida on February 15, 2014 in the main event at UFC Fight Night 36. He lost the fight via unanimous decision. Despite the loss, the bout won Mousasi his first Fight of the Night bonus award.

Mousasi faced Mark Muñoz on May 31, 2014 in the main event at UFC Fight Night 41. He won the fight via submission in the first round and became the first fighter to submit Muñoz. The win also earned Mousasi his first Performance of the Night bonus award.

Mousasi was expected to rematch Ronaldo Souza on August 2, 2014 at UFC 176. However, after UFC 176, was cancelled, Mousasi/Souza was rescheduled and took place on September 5, 2014 at UFC Fight Night 50.  Souza defeated Mousasi via submission in the third round.

Mousasi faced Dan Henderson on January 24, 2015 in the co-main event at UFC on Fox 14. He won the fight via TKO in the first round.  The win also earned Mousasi his second Performance of the Night bonus award.

Mousasi faced Costas Philippou on May 16, 2015 at UFC Fight Night 66. He won the fight by unanimous decision.

Mousasi was expected to face Roan Carneiro on September 27, 2015 at UFC Fight Night 75. However, Carneiro pulled out due to injury and was subsequently replaced by Uriah Hall. After dominating the opening round, Mousasi was finished early in the second after absorbing a jumping spinning back kick, flying knee and follow-up punches.

Mousasi was briefly linked to a fight with Michael Bisping on February 27, 2016 at UFC Fight Night 84. However, on December 24, 2015, Bisping was pulled from the bout in favor of a matchup with Anderson Silva at the same event. Mousasi instead faced Thales Leites. He won the fight via unanimous decision.

Mousasi was expected to face Derek Brunson on July 9, 2016 at UFC 200. It was later revealed that Brunson was forced to pull out of the fight, and that Thiago Santos would replace him to fight Mousasi. He won the fight via TKO in the first round and was awarded a Performance of the Night bonus.

A long-discussed fight with former light heavyweight champion Vitor Belfort took place on October 8, 2016 at UFC 204. Mousasi won the fight via TKO in the second round.

Mousasi next faced Uriah Hall in a rematch on November 19, 2016 at UFC Fight Night 99. He won the fight via TKO in the first round.

Mousasi faced Chris Weidman at UFC 210 on April 8, 2017. In the second round, Mousasi hit Weidman with two knees to the head, the latter of which had referee Dan Miragliotta interrupt the fight because he mistakenly thought it was illegal. However, upon consultation with another referee "Big" John McCarthy, both knees appeared to be legal under the new unified rules introduced since 2017. Ultimately, the bout was ended and deemed a TKO win for Mousasi. Mousasi accused Weidman of trying to win the fight by disqualification. Weidman admitted he was expecting to win the fight by disqualification. He was only willing to continue when told the knee was legal after almost two minutes of the allotted five to recover by Miragliotta under the assumption the knee was illegal. Audio from Weidman's corner revealed Matt Serra saying Weidman told physicians he thought it was February. Being unable to tell medical staff the correct date possibly influenced their decision not to let him continue. The NYSAC released a statement that instant replay had been used legally to determine if the knee was legal, disproving the claim of UFC Vice President of Regulatory Affairs Marc Ratner who had told Joe Rogan otherwise on the live pay-per-view.

Bellator MMA 
On 10 July 2017, Mousasi announced that he had signed with Bellator MMA for a six-fights deal and should compete for the middleweight title later in 2017. He also announced that his goal would be also to obtain the light heavyweight belt as well, after becoming the Bellator middleweight champion first.

During the Bellator 181 main card, it was announced by the promotion that Mousasi would make his debut against Alexander Shlemenko at Bellator 185 on 20 October 2017. In the opening minute a punch from Shlemenko broke Mousasi's right orbital, causing Mousasi to fight with one eye for almost the entire bout. The rest of the first round mainly consisted of Mousasi scoring multiple takedowns, landing many strikes, and attempting several neck cranks and rear naked chokes. A doctor inspected Mousasi's eye before the second round and deemed him fit to continue. In the second round, both fighters landed strikes in short exchanges for the first three minutes until Mousasi landed two takedowns and spent most of the last two minutes making submission attempts and landing strikes, which caused Shlemenko's face to bleed. When the round ended, Mousasi was still in a back mount dominant position over Shlemenko. In the third and final round, Schlemenko landed the better of strikes standing up and Mousasi's only takedown attempt was unsuccessful. Mousasi won the fight via unanimous decision. Seven out of eleven MMA media outlets scored the fight as a decision win for Shlemenko.

Bellator MMA Middleweight Champion 
Mousasi faced Rafael Carvalho on 25 May 2018 at Bellator 200 in London, England for the Bellator Middleweight World Championship. After scoring a takedown early, Mousasi used ground and pound to win the fight via TKO in the first round. Mousasi became the first fighter to win a world title in both Strikeforce and Bellator MMA.

Mousasi made his first title defense against current Bellator Welterweight Champion Rory MacDonald on 29 September 2018 at Bellator 206. Mousasi stuffed MacDonald's takedown attempt and delivered ground and pound, eventually winning the fight via technical knockout in round two.

Mousasi was expected to make his second title defense against Rafael Lovato Jr. in the co-headliner of Bellator 214 on 26 January 2019. However, on 20 December 2018, it was reported that Mousasi pulled from the fight, citing a back injury. The fight eventually took place at Bellator 223 on 22 June 2019. Mousasi lost the bout and his title by majority decision.

After losing the title, Mousasi rematched prior UFC opponent Lyoto Machida at Bellator 228 on 28 September 2019. He was victorious by way of split decision.

Second title reign
In February 2020, it was announced that Rafael Lovato Jr. was forced to relinquish the Bellator Middleweight World Championship due to a cerebral cavernoma. Bellator then announced that Mousasi would face current Bellator Welterweight Champion Douglas Lima for the vacant Bellator Middleweight World Championship at Bellator 242 on 9 May 2020. At the time, Mousasi also signed a new, eight-fight contract with Bellator. However, it was announced that Bellator 242 and Mousasi's fight against Lima would be postponed due to the COVID-19 pandemic. Mousasi's bout against Lima was rescheduled to take place at Bellator 250. Mousasi won the fight via unanimous decision and claimed the title for a second time.

Mousasi made the first title defense of his second reign against John Salter on August 13, 2021 at Bellator 264. He won the bout via TKO in round three.

Mousasi made his second middleweight title defence against Austin Vanderford at Bellator 275 on February 25, 2022 at the 3Arena in Dublin, Ireland. He won the fight via technical knockout in round one.

Mousasi attempted his third middleweight title defence against Johnny Eblen at Bellator 282 on June 24, 2022  He lost the bout via 50-45 unanimous decision on all judges' scorecards.

Mousasi is scheduled to face Fabian Edwards on May 12, 2023, at Bellator 296.

Kickboxing

K-1 Dynamite!! 2008
In somewhat of a surprise to the MMA world, Mousasi agreed to take on Japanese K-1 fighter Musashi in a K-1 rules fight at Dynamite!! 2008. Being an open weight fight Mousasi weighed in at 97.8 kg/216 lb, all but confirming his desire to move up in weight classes. Mousasi stated after winning the Dream Middleweight Grand Prix he would no longer fight at middleweight due to the large weight cut. Mousasi was the rank outsider to win the match against the more experienced Musashi, but came out fast and scored a first-round KO. Mousasi went undefeated in 2008, going 6–0 in MMA and 1–0 in K-1.

K-1 Dynamite!! 2010
After a lot of speculation about Mousasi's opponent for 2010 New Year's Eve, Mousasi was set to face Kyotaro, the K-1 Heavyweight Champion, in a K-1 rules bout. He brought the fight to Kyotaro and in the second round Mousasi knocked the Japanese fighter down, almost finishing him. Mousasi then won a unanimous decision victory from the judges.

2012 Summer Olympics
It was revealed on January 31, 2011 that Mousasi was considering trying out for the 2012 Summer Olympics at the category of boxing. Mousasi would try to qualify himself through Netherlands qualifiers. His management said that it would make him a better fighter. Mousasi is already known in amateur boxing, being a former Netherlands amateur boxing champion.

Following an injury and the signing of a new contract with Strikeforce, he gave up interest in competing in the Olympics.

Personal life
Mousasi has relatives in both Iran and Armenia. He is an Armenian Apostolic Christian.

His older brother Gewik was a mixed martial artist before him, and Gegard decided to follow in his footsteps. Gewik is currently a prolific MMA trainer in Holland. He also currently handles the finances for Gegard's career payments.

Mousasi is the godfather of Satoshi Ishii's son Mousasi Ishi, who is named after him.

Mousasi's moniker, "Dream Catcher", was given by a friend which he was not fond of as he considered his style of fighting could not be named.

Championships and accomplishments

Boxing
Nederlandse Boks Bond
Netherlands Amateur Boxing National Championship (2001)

Mixed martial arts
Bellator MMA
 Bellator Middleweight  World Championship  (Two times; former) 
Three successful title defenses (overall)
One successful title defense (first reign)
Two successful title defense (second reign)
Cage Warriors Fighting Championship
Cage Warriors Middleweight Championship (One time)
DREAM
DREAM Middleweight Championship (One time; First; Last; Only)
DREAM Light Heavyweight Championship (One time; First; Last; Only)
One successful title defense
First combatant to win DREAM Championships in multiple weight classes (Two)
Strikeforce
Strikeforce Light Heavyweight Championship (One time)
Fastest stoppage in a Strikeforce title bout (1:00; vs. Renato Sobral)
Ultimate Fighting Championship
Fight of the Night (One time) vs. Lyoto Machida
Performance of the Night (Three times) vs. Mark Muñoz, Dan Henderson, and Thiago Santos
Bleacher Report
2008 Fighter of the Year
Inside MMA
2008 Biggest Breakthrough Bazzie Award
World MMA Awards
2009 European Fighter of the Year
MMADNA.nl
2016 Dutch Fighter of the Year.
2017 Dutch Fighter of the Year.

Mixed martial arts record

|-
|Loss
|align=center|49–8–2
|Johnny Eblen
|Decision (unanimous)
|Bellator 282
|
|align=center|5
|align=center|5:00
|Uncasville, Connecticut, United States
|
|-
|Win
|align=center|49–7–2
|Austin Vanderford
|TKO (punches)
|Bellator 275
|
|align=center|1
|align=center|1:25
|Dublin, Ireland
|
|-
|Win
|align=center|48–7–2
|John Salter
|TKO (punches)
|Bellator 264
|
|align=center|3
|align=center|2:07
|Uncasville, Connecticut, United States
|
|-
|Win
|align=center|47–7–2
|Douglas Lima
|Decision (unanimous) 
|Bellator 250
|
|align=center|5
|align=center|5:00
|Uncasville, Connecticut, United States
|
|-
|Win
|align=center|46–7–2
|Lyoto Machida 
|Decision (split) 
|Bellator 228
|
|align=center|3
|align=center|5:00
|Inglewood, California, United States
|
|-
|Loss
|align=center|45–7–2
|Rafael Lovato Jr.
|Decision (majority)
|Bellator 223
|
|align=center|5
|align=center|5:00
|London, England
|
|-
|Win
|align=center|
|Rory MacDonald
|TKO (elbows and punches)
|Bellator 206
|
|align=center|2
|align=center|3:23
|San Jose, California, United States
|
|-
|Win
|align=center|44–6–2
|Rafael Carvalho
|TKO (punches)
|Bellator 200
|
|align=center|1
|align=center|3:35
|London, England
|
|-
|Win
|align=center|43–6–2
|Alexander Shlemenko
|Decision (unanimous)
|Bellator 185
|
|align=center|3
|align=center|5:00
|Uncasville, Connecticut, United States
|
|-
|Win
|align=center|42–6–2
|Chris Weidman
|TKO (knees)
|UFC 210
|
|align=center|2
|align=center|3:13
|Buffalo, New York, United States
|
|-
|Win
|align=center|41–6–2
|Uriah Hall
|TKO (punches)
|UFC Fight Night: Mousasi vs. Hall 2
|
|align=center|1
|align=center|4:37
|Belfast, Northern Ireland
|
|-
|Win
|align=center|40–6–2
|Vitor Belfort
|TKO (punches)
|UFC 204
|
|align=center|2
|align=center|2:43
|Manchester, England
|
|-
|Win
|align=center|39–6–2
|Thiago Santos
|KO (punches)
|UFC 200
|
|align=center|1
|align=center|4:32
|Las Vegas, Nevada, United States
|
|-
|Win
|align=center|38–6–2
|Thales Leites
|Decision (unanimous)
|UFC Fight Night: Silva vs. Bisping
|
|align=center|3
|align=center|5:00 
|London, England
|
|-
|Loss
|align=center|37–6–2
|Uriah Hall
|TKO (flying knee and punches)
|UFC Fight Night: Barnett vs. Nelson
|
|align=center|2
|align=center|0:25
|Saitama, Japan
|
|-
|Win
|align=center|37–5–2
|Costas Philippou
|Decision (unanimous)
|UFC Fight Night: Edgar vs. Faber
|
|align=center|3
|align=center|5:00
|Pasay, Philippines
|
|-
|Win
|align=center|36–5–2
|Dan Henderson
|TKO (punches)
|UFC on Fox: Gustafsson vs. Johnson
|
|align=center|1
|align=center|1:10
|Stockholm, Sweden
|
|-
|Loss
|align=center|35–5–2
|Ronaldo Souza
|Submission (guillotine choke)
|UFC Fight Night: Jacare vs. Mousasi
|
|align=center|3
|align=center|4:30
|Mashantucket, Connecticut, United States
|
|-
|Win
|align=center|35–4–2
|Mark Muñoz
|Submission (rear-naked choke)
|UFC Fight Night: Munoz vs. Mousasi
|
|align=center|1
|align=center|3:57
|Berlin, Germany
|
|-
|Loss
|align=center|34–4–2
|Lyoto Machida
|Decision (unanimous)
|UFC Fight Night: Machida vs. Mousasi
|
|align=center|5 
|align=center|5:00
|Jaraguá do Sul, Brazil
|
|-
|Win
|align=center|34–3–2
|Ilir Latifi
|Decision (unanimous)
|UFC on Fuel TV: Mousasi vs. Latifi
|
|align=center|3
|align=center|5:00
|Stockholm, Sweden
|
|-
| Win
| align=center| 33–3–2
| Mike Kyle
| Submission (rear-naked choke)
| Strikeforce: Marquardt vs. Saffiedine
| 
| align=center| 1
| align=center| 4:09
| Oklahoma City, Oklahoma, United States
| 
|-
| Win
| align=center| 32–3–2
| Ovince Saint Preux
| Decision (unanimous)
| Strikeforce: Melendez vs. Masvidal
| 
| align=center| 3
| align=center| 5:00
| San Diego, California, United States
| 
|-
| Win
| align=center| 31–3–2
| Hiroshi Izumi 
| TKO (punches)
| Dream: Japan GP Final
| 
| align=center| 1
| align=center| 3:29
| Tokyo, Japan
| 
|-
| Draw
| align=center| 30–3–2
| Keith Jardine
| Draw (majority)
| Strikeforce: Diaz vs. Daley
| 
| align=center| 3
| align=center| 5:00
| San Diego, California, United States
| 
|-
| Win
| align=center| 30–3–1
| Tatsuya Mizuno
| Submission (rear-naked choke)
| Dream 16
| 
| align=center| 1
| align=center| 6:10
| Nagoya, Japan
| 
|-
| Win
| align=center| 29–3–1
| Jake O'Brien
| Submission (guillotine choke)
| Dream 15
| 
| align=center| 1
| align=center| 0:31
| Saitama, Japan
| 
|-
| Loss
| align=center| 28–3–1
| Muhammed Lawal
| Decision (unanimous)
| Strikeforce: Nashville
| 
| align=center| 5
| align=center| 5:00
| Nashville, Tennessee, United States
| 
|-
| Win
| align=center| 28–2–1
| Gary Goodridge
| TKO (punches)
| Dynamite!! 2009
| 
| align=center| 1
| align=center| 1:34
| Saitama, Japan
| 
|-
| Win
| align=center| 27–2–1
| Rameau Thierry Sokoudjou
| TKO (punches)
| Strikeforce: Fedor vs. Rogers
| 
| align=center| 2
| align=center| 3:43
| Hoffman Estates, Illinois, United States
|
|-
| Win
| align=center| 26–2–1
| Renato Sobral
| KO (punches)
| Strikeforce: Carano vs. Cyborg
| 
| align=center| 1
| align=center| 1:00
| San Jose, California, United States
| 
|-
| Win
| align=center| 25–2–1
| Mark Hunt
| Submission (straight armbar)
| Dream 9
| 
| align=center| 1
| align=center| 1:19
| Yokohama, Japan
| 
|-
| Win
| align=center| 24–2–1
| Ronaldo Souza
| KO (upkick)
|rowspan=2|Dream 6: Middleweight Grand Prix 2008 Final Round
|rowspan=2|
| align=center| 1
| align=center| 2:15
|rowspan=2|Saitama, Japan
| 
|-
| Win
| align=center| 23–2–1
| Melvin Manhoef
| Submission (triangle choke)
| align=center| 1
| align=center| 1:28
| 
|-
| Win
| align=center| 22–2–1
| Yoon Dong-sik
| Decision (unanimous)
| Dream 4: Middleweight Grand Prix 2008 Second Round
| 
| align=center| 2
| align=center| 5:00
| Yokohama, Japan
| 
|-
| Win
| align=center| 21–2–1
| Denis Kang
| Submission (triangle choke)
| Dream 2: Middleweight Grand Prix 2008 First Round
| 
| align=center| 1
| align=center| 3:10
| Saitama, Japan
| 
|-
| Win
| align=center| 20–2–1
| Steve Mensing 
| TKO (punches)
| M-1: Slamm
| 
| align=center| 1
| align=center| 2:44
| Landsmeer, Netherlands
| 
|-
| Win
| align=center| 19–2–1
| Evangelista Santos 
| TKO (punches)
| Hardcore Championship Fighting: Destiny
| 
| align=center| 1
| align=center| 3:42
| Calgary, Alberta, Canada
| 
|-
| Win
| align=center| 18–2–1
| Damir Mirenic
| TKO (punches)
| Hardcore Championship Fighting: Title Wave
| 
| align=center| 1
| align=center| 4:46
| Calgary, Alberta, Canada
| 
|-
| Win
| align=center| 17–2–1
| Kyacey Uscola
| TKO (punches)
| Bodog FIGHT
| 
| align=center| 1
| align=center| 4:56
| Vancouver, British Columbia, Canada
| 
|-
| Win
| align=center| 16–2–1
| Alexander Kokoev 
| Submission (arm-triangle choke)
| M-1 MFC: Battle on the Neva
| 
| align=center| 3
| align=center| 5:00
| Saint Petersburg, Russia
| 
|-
| Win
| align=center| 15–2–1
| Gregory Bouchelaghem
| TKO (submission to punches)
| CWFC: Enter The Rough House
| 
| align=center| 1
| align=center| 2:20
| Nottingham, England
| 
|-
| Win
| align=center| 14–2–1
| Héctor Lombard
| Decision (unanimous)
| Pride - Bushido 13
| 
| align=center| 2
| align=center| 5:00
| Yokohama, Japan
| 
|-
| Loss
| align=center| 13–2–1
| Akihiro Gono
| Submission (armbar)
| Pride - Bushido 12
| 
| align=center| 2
| align=center| 4:24
| Nagoya, Japan
| 
|-
| Win
| align=center| 13–1–1
| Makoto Takimoto 
| TKO (broken eye socket)
| Pride - Bushido 11
| 
| align=center| 1
| align=center| 5:34
| Saitama, Japan
| 
|-
| Win
| align=center| 12–1–1
| Hidetada Irie 
| TKO (corner stoppage)
| Deep: 24 Impact
| 
| align=center| 2
| align=center| 1:29
| Tokyo, Japan
| 
|-
| Win
| align=center| 11–1–1
| Sanjin Kadunc
| TKO (punches)
| Future Battle
| 
| align=center| 1
| align=center| 0:35
| Bergen op Zoom, Netherlands
| 
|-
| Win
| align=center| 10–1–1
| Andre Fyeet
| TKO (punches)
| 2H2H: Mixed Fight
| 
| align=center| 1
| align=center| 0:40
| Landsmeer, Netherlands
| 
|-
| Win
| align=center| 9–1–1
| Tsuyoshi Kurihara
| KO (knee)
| Deep: 22 Impact
| 
| align=center| 1
| align=center| 0:10
| Tokyo, Japan
| 
|-
| Win
| align=center| 8–1–1
| Stefan Klever
| TKO (punches)
| Europe: Rotterdam Rumble
| 
| align=center| 1
| align=center| 3:39
| Rotterdam, Netherlands
| 
|-
| Win
| align=center| 7–1–1
| Chico Martinez
| Submission (rear-naked choke)
| Jaap Edenhal: Holland vs. Russia
| 
| align=center| 1
| align=center| 4:39
| Landsmeer, Netherlands
| 
|-
| Win
| align=center| 6–1–1
| John Donnelly
| Submission (armbar)
| Rings: Bushido Ireland
| 
| align=center| 1
| align=center| 1:02
| Dublin, Ireland
| 
|-
| Loss
| align=center| 5–1–1
| Petras Markevicius
| Submission (armbar)
| Fight Festival 13
| 
| align=center| 2
| align=center| 1:49
| Helsinki, Finland
| 
|-
| Win
| align=center| 5–0–1
| Erik Oganov
| Submission (rear-naked choke)
| M-1 MFC: International Fight Night
| 
| align=center| 1
| align=center| 2:16
| Saint Petersburg, Russia
| 
|-
| Win
| align=center| 4–0–1
| Rody Trost
| TKO (punches)
| International Mix-Fight Association: Mix Fight
| 
| align=center| 1
| align=center| 3:18
| Landsmeer, Netherlands
| 
|-
| Win
| align=center| 3–0–1
| Niko Puhakka
| Submission (rear-naked choke)
| Fight Festival 11
| 
| align=center| 2
| align=center| 2:17
| Helsinki, Finland
| 
|-
| Draw
| align=center| 2–0–1
| Gilson Ferreira
| Draw
| Fight Gala
| 
| align=center| 2
| align=center| 5:00
| Zaandam, Netherlands
| 
|-
| Win
| align=center| 2–0
| Xander Nel
| TKO (punches)
| International Mix-Fight Association: Mixfight 
| 
| align=center| 1
| align=center| 1:05
| Badhoevedorp, Netherlands
| 
|-
| Win
| align=center| 1–0
| Daniel Spek
| TKO (punches)
| 2H2H: 1st Open Team
| 
| align=center| 1
| align=center| 3:40
| Amsterdam, Netherlands
|

Kickboxing record

|-  bgcolor="#CCFFCC"
|2010-12-31 || Win ||align=left| Kyotaro ||Dynamite!! 2010 ||Saitama, Japan || Decision (unanimous) || 3 || 3:00 || 5–0
|-
! style=background:white colspan=9 |K-1 rules 3 x 3.
|-
|-  bgcolor="#CCFFCC"
|2008-12-31 || Win ||align=left| Musashi ||Dynamite!! 2008 ||Saitama, Japan || TKO (referee stoppage) || 1 || 2:32 || 4–0
|-
! style=background:white colspan=9 |K-1 rules 3 x 3.
|-
|-  bgcolor="#CCFFCC"
|2004-10-16 || Win ||align=left| Enrico Grootenhuis ||Muay Thai & Mixfight Gala ||Emmen, Netherlands || KO (strikes) || 1 || 0:35 || 3–0
|-
! style=background:white colspan=9 |Muay Thai rules (B-class 5 x 2).
|-
|-  bgcolor="#CCFFCC"
|2004-01-25 || Win ||align=left| Arno Hilckmann ||Muay Thai Gala || Alkmaar, Netherlands || Decision (unanimous) || 3 || 2:00 || 2–0
|-
! style=background:white colspan=9 |Muay Thai rules (C-class 3 x 2).
|-
|-  bgcolor="#CCFFCC"
|2003-06-14 || Win ||align=left| Surinder Baghola ||Muay Thai Warrior ||Rhoon, Netherlands || TKO (strikes) || 1 || 1:04 || 1–0
|-
! style=background:white colspan=9 |Muay Thai rules (C-class 3 x 2).
|-
| colspan=9| Legend:

See also
 List of current Bellator fighters
 List of current mixed martial arts champions
 List of Strikeforce alumni
 List of male mixed martial artists

References

External links
 
 Gegard Mousasi at K-1 (archived)
 Gegard Mousasi at Dream (in Japanese)

 

1985 births
Living people
Dutch male mixed martial artists
Iranian male mixed martial artists
Middleweight mixed martial artists
Light heavyweight mixed martial artists
Mixed martial artists utilizing boxing
Mixed martial artists utilizing kickboxing
Mixed martial artists utilizing judo
Mixed martial artists utilizing Brazilian jiu-jitsu
Ultimate Fighting Championship male fighters
Dream (mixed martial arts) champions
Strikeforce (mixed martial arts) champions
Bellator MMA champions
Dutch male judoka
Dutch male kickboxers
Iranian male judoka
Iranian male kickboxers
Heavyweight kickboxers
Dutch practitioners of Brazilian jiu-jitsu
Iranian practitioners of Brazilian jiu-jitsu
Armenian Apostolic Christians
Dutch people of Armenian descent
Iranian people of Armenian descent
Iranian emigrants to the Netherlands
Sportspeople from Tehran
Sportspeople from Leiden
Bellator male fighters